Purachatra Jayakara, Prince of Kamphaengphet (23 January 1881 – 14 September 1936) was a Prince of Siam and a member of the Siamese Royal Family (later Thailand). He founded the House of Chatrajaya, his descendants still use this royal surname. He was a son of King Chulalongkorn (Rama V the Great) of Siam. He was often called the Father of the Thai radio and the Father of the Thai railways, due to his contributions in both fields.

Biography
Prince Purachatra Jayakara was born on 23 January 1881, in the compound of the Grand Palace. He was the 35th son of Chulalongkorn and Consort Wad. He received the education in Suankularb Wittayalai School. In 1894, he attended Harrow School, England. Then attended School of Engineering at Trinity College, Cambridge, and engineering at Chatham. And he attended studying in France and Netherlands in the School of engineering of digging dam-canals. After graduating, he went back to work in England. He became the officer of the Institution of Civil engineer.

He came back to Thailand in 1904. He worked as the military engineer, and officer of the Siamese Royal Army. He had served for 17 years. He developed the Siamese Department of Engineering militaries in his knowledge he got from the western. Later he retired himself and moved to Singapore with his family in 1933. He resided there until his death on 14 September 1936, at the age of 55.

Royal duties

Thai railways
In the reign of King Chulalongkorn. He gave the Siamese railway offices in control of the foreigners, for administration in the railways system around Thailand. Until his death in 1910, starting the new reign of King Vajiravudh (Rama VI), he requested his stepbrother, Prince Purachatra Jayakara to be the Head of the Northern railway department. Later in 1917, King Vajiravudh merged the railways of the Northern line and the Southern line into the Royal Railway department and had Prince Purachatra Jayakara as the first commander. He developed and well-administrated the railway system. He expanded the rail lines around the northern and southern territory. Moreover, he created Northeastern Line, started from Nakhon Ratchasima Province to Ubon Ratchathani Province. And Eastern Line, started from Chachoengsao Province to Sa Kaeo Province which ended at Aranyaprathet District. He purchased 2 180 horsepower diesel locomotives from Swiss Locomotive and Machine Works to use for local train around Bangkok in 1928, as the first country in Asia to do so.

Later, King Vajiravudh dissolved the road department and included into the Royal Railway Department. Prince Purachatra Jayakara was responsibility for creating all the roads and bridges around the country, such as the Kasatsuk Bridge, Ratchadaphisek Bridge in Lampang Province, Phra Buddha Yodfa Bridge and Rama VI Bridge, the first bridge to cross Chao Phraya River.

In 1921, he served as the commander of the railway department. He brought the engine of searching crude oil, firstly in Fang District, Chiang Mai Province where the people there found many amounts of crude oil. He hired the American Geologist to work as surveying in geological system, for finding crude oil and coal around Thailand.

Transportation and Communications

He was the first to bring the communication system into the country. He set up a small radio for trial broadcasting and first broadcast in 1930. He established the first radio broadcasting station called Phayathai radio station. He was the first person of Siam to establishing the communication broadcasting system in the country. Then he became the Ministry of Commerce and Transport. He considered about establishing the television broadcasting transmission, which would have made Siam the first country in Asia to experiment with television, and had contacted an American company to provide and install equipment; however, because of the Siamese Revolution of 1932, the project was cancelled. Furthermore, he created the telegraph offices around the country, for mailing services, parcel, and postal services. He created the communication services from Thailand to many foreign countries.

In the transportation systems, he interested about the flight operation systems. He demonstrated flying, later acknowledged as the first Thai people embarking. He then established the flight operation systems business aviation, including the international aviation, for commercial aviation international services.

On 1 April 1926, he became the Minister of Commerce and Transport, which were both included into the one ministry. After the Siamese Revolution, he usually did the royal duties and royal ceremonies represented his half-brother, King Prajadhipok (Rama VII), before his abdication.

Marriage and issue

Prince Purachatra Jayakara, the Prince of Kamphaengphet had 7 consorts, and 12 children; 4 sons and 8 daughters.

He firstly married on 16 November 1904 with his cousin, Princess Prabhavasidhi Narumala, daughter of the Prince Chakrabadibongse, King Chulalongkorn's younger brother. The couple had 4 children; 1 son and 3 daughters;
 Princess Mayurachatra (7 March 1906 – 11 August 1970), married [Mom Chao Sohbhana Bharadaya Savastivatana, has issue
 'Princess (died after birth)
 Prince Prem Purachatra (12 August 1915 – 24 July 1981), married Ngamchitti Sarsas, no issue. He originated the House of Purachatra, separated from his father.
 Princess Vimolchatra (27 June 1921 – 5 December 2009), married Prince (Mom Chao) Udaya Chalermlabh Vudhijaya, son of Prince Vuthichaya Chalermlabha, the Prince Singhavikrom Kriangkrai, has issue.

He secondly married with the Chiang Mai's princess, Princess Ladakham of Chiang Mai had 2 daughters;
 Princess Chatrasuda Chatrajaya (27 February 1920 – 21 May 1996), firstly married with Mom Chao Ravivanna Bairojana Rabhibhat, later relinquished the royal title and married secondly with Narong Wongthongsri, businessman.
 Princess Bhadaralada Chatrajaya (21 March 1924 – 29 March 2008), married Mom Chao Biriyadis Diskul, had issue.

Mom Pian Chatrajaya na Ayudhya (née Surakup; 1 September 1899 – 14 July 1938), had 1 daughter;
 Princess Kanchanachatra Chatrajaya (21 December 1921 – 20 July 1988), married Mom Chao Prasomsuksavasdi Suksavasdi, had issue

Mom Pued Chatrajaya na Ayudhaya (née Pheungrakwong; 12 June 1906 – 5 March 1984), had 1 son;
 Prince Surachatra Chatrajaya (15 June 1929 – 27 August 1993), married firstly with Rajda Israsena na Ayudhya, and secondly with Mom Rajawongse Ruengrambai Jumbala, had issue.

Mom Buaphud Chatrajaya na Ayudhya (née Intrasut; born 5 April 1911), had 1 son and 1 daughter;
 Princess Fuengchatra Chatrajaya (9 May 1932 – 8 July 2004), married Mom Rajawongse Bibadhanadis Diskul, had issue
 Prince Bipulchatra Chatrajaya (12 September 1935 – 31 May 1956)

Mom Chamlong Chatrajaya na Ayudhya (née Chalanukroh; 8 September 1913 – 4 November 1968), had 1 daughter;
 Princess Hiranyachatra Chatrajaya (20 October 1933 – 19 October 1998, relinquished the royal title and married Alfred Fitting, and secondly with Bevan Edwards, had issue.

Mom Euam Chatrajaya na Ayudhya (née Aruntat; 14 October 1910 – 16 February 1948), had 1 son;
 Prince Dibyachatra Chatrajaya (born 6 October 1934), married Charusri Ratanawaraha, Mandhana Bunnag, and Orasri Leenawat, has issue

Royal decorations
  Knight of The Ancient and Auspicious Order of the Nine Gems
  Knight of The Most Illustrious Order of the Royal House of Chakri
  Knight Grand Cordon (Special Class) of The Most Illustrious Order of Chula Chom Klao
  Knight Commander of the Honourable of the Order of Rama (1st class)
  Knight Grand Cordon (Special Class) of the Most Exalted Order of the White Elephant
  Knight Grand Cross (First Class) of the Most Noble Order of the Crown of Thailand
  Member of the Ratana Varabhorn Order of Merit
  King Rama V Royal Cypher Medal, Second Class
  King Rama VI Royal Cypher Medal, First Class
  King Rama VII Royal Cypher Medal, First Class

His style was The Prince of Kamphaengphet, translated as Krom Muen Kamphaengphet Akarayothin on 29 January 1904. Later elevated by King Prajadhipok from Krom Muen to Krom Phra, the second level of the Krom ranks.

Ancestry

References

1881 births
1936 deaths
19th-century Thai people
People educated at Harrow School
Alumni of Trinity College, Cambridge
Thai male Phra Ong Chao
Chatrajaya family
Knights Grand Cordon of the Order of Chula Chom Klao
Knights Grand Commander (Senangapati) of the Order of Rama
Knights of the Ratana Varabhorn Order of Merit
Recipients of the Dushdi Mala Medal, Pin of Arts and Science
Children of Chulalongkorn
Ministers of Commerce of Thailand
Ministers of Transport of Thailand
19th-century Chakri dynasty
20th-century Chakri dynasty
Sons of kings